Laurens Willy Symons (born 28 August 2001) is a Belgian professional footballer who plays as a forward for the reserve team of Mechelen.

Club career
On 5 February 2018, Symons signed his first professional contract with Lokeren, having joined their youth academy in 2015. Symons made his professional debut for Lokeren in a 2–1 Belgian First Division A loss to Waasland-Beveren on 22 December 2018.

On 29 January 2020, Symons moved to Mechelen on a deal until June 2022 with an option for one further year. 18-year old Symons was registered for the club's reserve team.

In May 2021, he was sent on loan to Icelandic second division club Grindavík for the rest of the year.

References

External links
Soccerway Profile

2001 births
Living people
People from Brasschaat
Belgian footballers
Belgian expatriate footballers
Belgium youth international footballers
Association football forwards
K.S.C. Lokeren Oost-Vlaanderen players
K.V. Mechelen players
Belgian Pro League players
Grindavík men's football players
1. deild karla players
Expatriate footballers in Iceland
Belgian expatriate sportspeople in Iceland
Footballers from Antwerp Province